The 12th Pan American Games were held in Mar del Plata, Argentina from March 11 to March 26, 1995.

Medals

Gold

Women's – 47 kg: Betsy Ortíz

Silver

Men's Bantamweight (– 54 kg): José Miguel Cotto
Men's Featherweight (– 57 kg): Alex Trujillo
Men's Light-Welterweight (– 63.5 kg): Luis Deines Pérez
Men's Welterweight (– 67 kg): Daniel Santos

Men's Horizontal Bar: Victor Colon

Women's Team Competition: Puerto Rico women's national softball team

Men's Freestyle (– 62 kg): Anibal Nieves
Men's Greco-Roman (– 82 kg): José Betancourt
Men's Greco-Roman (– 130 kg): Edwin Millet

Bronze

Women's Recurve 30 m: María Reyes

Men's Long Jump: Elmer Williams

Men's Team Competition: Puerto Rico national baseball team

Men's Flyweight (– 51 kg): José Juan Cotto
Men's Light-Heavyweight (– 81 kg): Edgardo Santos
Men's Heavyweight (– 91 kg): Moisés Rolón

Men's Points Race: Juán Merhed

Women's Flyweight (– 45 kg): Evelyn Matías

Men's Kumite (+ 80 kg): Otilio Cartagena
Men's Kumite (Open Class): Eric Albino

Men's – 85 kg: Aníbal Cintrón

Men's 108 kg: Ramón Álvarez

Results by event

See also

Puerto Rico at the 1996 Summer Olympics

References

Nations at the 1995 Pan American Games
1995 in Puerto Rican sports
1995